In Attic drama, the coryphaeus, corypheus, or koryphaios (Greek κορυφαῖος koryphaîos, from κορυφή koryphḗ́, the top of the head) was the leader of the chorus. Hence the term (sometimes in an Anglicized form "coryphe") is used for the chief or leader of any company or movement. The coryphaeus spoke for all the rest, whenever the chorus took part in the action, in quality of a person of the drama, during the course of the acts.

The term is sometimes used for the chief or principal of any company, corporation, sect, opinion, etc. Thus, Eustathius of Antioch is called the coryphaeus of the First Council of Nicaea, and Cicero calls Zeno the coryphaeus of the Stoics.

Paul the Apostle is often entitled Coryphaeus in Christian iconography.

In 1856 at the University of Oxford, the office of Coryphaeus or Praecentor was founded, whose duty it was to lead the musical performances directed by the Choragus. The office ceased to exist in 1899.

In Solzhenitsyn’s In the First Circle Stalin is often referred to as Coryphaeus, meaning that he speaks for all in the Soviet Union.

In video games
Corypheus is an antagonist introduced in the Legacy DLC for Dragon Age II. The same Corypheus returns as the central antagonist and the catalyst to the events of Dragon Age: Inquisition.

See also
 USS Corypheus
 Theatre of Coryphaei

References

Ancient Greek theatre